Frederick Casimir Kettler (German: Friedrich Casimir Kettler; 6 July 1650 – 22 January 1698) was Duke of Courland and Semigallia from 1682 to 1698. Frederick Casimir was the son of Jacob Kettler and Louise Charlotte of Brandenburg.
In his reign the Duchy lost its geopolitical position and became Sweden, Prussia and Russia's territorial subject of interests.

Biography 
Frederick Casimir Kettler studied law in Germany and visited a number of European courts. In 1673 he was in the Dutch military service and took part with his Courland regiment in the Franco-Dutch War. On 5 October 1675, in The Hague, Frederick Casimir married princess Sophie Amalie of Nassau-Siegen and returned home.
After his father died Frederick Casimir became the Duke of Courland and Semigallia and vigorously resorted to public affairs. In 1684 the duke's book printer George Radeckis in Jelgava became the first person to print books in the Latvian language. His efforts to restore the holdings were stopped by the power of Sweden, which at that time prevailed in northern Europe. However, Friedrich Casimir founded splendid court life according to the best Western models.

In 1688 Sophie Amalie died. In 1691 Frederick Casimir celebrated a large-scale wedding with Elisabeth Sophie of Brandenburg.

During the reign of Frederick Casimir, trade and industry of the duchy started to decay. In 1693 the Tobago colony was sold to England. In the spring of 1697, Friedrich Casimir received a grand delegation from Russia, including the new Tsar Peter I, on whom the Jelgava Palace and its court left a great impression. The duchy and Russia held diplomatic talks on mutual cooperation against the Swedes, but in the next winter of 1698, Frederick Casimir died at the age of 47. His minor son Frederick Wilhelm became the next duke.

Issue 

From 1st marriage:

 Frederick Kettler (3 April 1682 – 11 February 1683), Hereditary Prince of Courland.
 Marie Dorothea Kettler (2 August 1684 – 17 January 1743), married to Albert Frederick, Margrave of Brandenburg-Schwedt.
 Eleonore Charlotte Kettler (11 June 1686 – 28 July 1748), married to Ernest Ferdinand, Duke of Brunswick-Lüneburg in Bevern.
 Christina Sophia Kettler (15 November 1688 – 22 April 1694).

From 2nd marriage:

 Frederick William Kettler, Duke of Courland (19 July 1692 – 21 January 1711), married to Grand Duchess Anna Ioannovna of Russia.
 Leopold Charles Kettler (14 December 1693 – 21 July 1697).

Notes

References

Sources
 
 
 
 

Dukes of Courland
1650 births
1698 deaths
17th-century Latvian people
People from Jelgava
Burials in the Ducal Crypt of the Jelgava Palace